Aproaerema palpilineella is a moth of the family Gelechiidae. It was described by Vactor Tousey Chambers in 1875. It is found in North America, where it has been recorded from Georgia, Illinois, Indiana, Kansas, Kentucky, Louisiana, Maine, Mississippi, Ohio, Oklahoma, Ontario, Quebec, Tennessee and Texas.

Adults are dark brown, almost black, but with an irregular white fascia at the beginning of the cilia, which is sometimes interrupted in the middle.

The larvae feed on Trifolium species and Coronilla varia.

Aproaerema palpilineella was formerly in the genus Syncopacma.

References

Moths described in 1875
Aproaerema